Nadir Sbaa (born 22 April 1982) is a retired Belgian professional footballer and beach soccer player. He is currently the manager of Walhain.

Career
Sbaa is a well travelled player, being employed by no less than nine Belgian teams during his career. He also played a very short period with Ethnikos Asteras from Greece. Although mainly playing with clubs in the Belgian Second Division, Sbaa played at the highest level of Belgian football with Beveren during the 2001-2002 season.

Coaching career
In the summer 2018, Sbaa started as assistant manager for Belgian club, RUW Ciney. In September 2019, Sbaa was appointed manager of Walhain.

References

External links
 

1982 births
Living people
Belgian footballers
Belgian football managers
Belgian Pro League players
Challenger Pro League players
Union Royale Namur Fosses-La-Ville players
Beerschot A.C. players
K.S.K. Beveren players
A.F.C. Tubize players
Oud-Heverlee Leuven players
R. Olympic Charleroi Châtelet Farciennes players
RFC Liège players
Sportspeople from Namur (city)
Association football forwards
R.F.C. Meux players
Footballers from Namur (province)